Jason Telémaco Ingram Oporto (born 10 August 1997) is a Nicaraguan footballer who plays as a defender for Santos (Guápiles).

Career

Ingram started his career with Nicaraguan side Real Estelí.

Before the second half of 2018/19, Ingram signed for Santos (Guápiles) in Costa Rica, where he received interest from Europe.

References

External links
 
 

Living people
1997 births
Nicaraguan men's footballers
Nicaragua international footballers
Association football defenders
Real Estelí F.C. players
Juventus Managua players
Santos de Guápiles footballers
Nicaraguan Primera División players
Liga FPD players
Nicaraguan expatriate footballers
Nicaraguan expatriate sportspeople in Costa Rica
Expatriate footballers in Costa Rica
People from Bluefields